Geulei Teiman ( or , lit. The Redeemed of Yemen) is a religious moshav in central Israel. Located near Hadera in the Sharon plain, it falls under the jurisdiction of Hefer Valley Regional Council.

History
The moshav was founded in 1948 by residents of Kfar Yavetz, a village which was evacuated during the 1948 Arab–Israeli War. The residents were immigrants and refugees from Yemen.

In 1967, Geulei Teiman was split into a moshav and a housing project, but the two neighborhoods were reunited in 1992.

References

Moshavim
Religious Israeli communities
Populated places established in 1948
Populated places in Central District (Israel)
Yemeni-Jewish culture in Israel
1948 establishments in Israel